HD 50002 (HR 2536) is a solitary star in the southern circumpolar constellation Volans. It is faintly visible to the naked eye with an apparent magnitude of 6.09 and is located at a distance of 708 light years.

HD 50002 has a classification of K3 III, indicating that it is a red giant. HD 50002 is metal enriched, with 166% the abundance of heavy metals compared to the Sun, and has a projected rotational velocity too low to be measured accurately.

Refrerences

Volans (constellation)
K-type giants
050002
Durchmusterung objects
032332
2536
Volantis, 4